Leigh (David) Blackmore (born 1959) is an Australian horror writer, critic, editor, occultist, musician and proponent of post-left anarchy. He was the Australian representative for the Horror Writers of America (1994–95) and served as the second President of the Australian Horror Writers Association (2010–2011). His work has been nominated four times for the Ditmar Award, once for fiction and three times for the William Atheling Jr. Award for criticism. He has been a Finalist in both the Poetry and Criticism categories of the Australian Shadows Awards. He has contributed entries to such encyclopedias as S.T. Joshi and Stefan J. Dziemianowicz (eds) Supernatural Literature of the World (Greenwood Press, 2005, 3 vols) and June Pulliam and Tony Fonseca (eds), Ghosts in Popular Culture and Legend (ABC-Clio, 2016).

According to The Melbourne University Press Encyclopedia of Australian Science Fiction and Fantasy, "His name is now synonymous with Australian horror," and a Hodder & Stoughton press release stated that, "Leigh Blackmore is to horror what Glenn A. Baker is to rock and roll." He has also been recognised as "one of the leading weird poets of our era," and has been nominated for the Science Fiction Poetry Association's Rhysling Award. His fiction has appeared in Australia, the USA, the UK, France, Denmark and Sweden. Translations of his poetry have appeared in French and Italian.

Early life (1959–1976)
Leigh Blackmore was born in Sydney, New South Wales, the son of Rod and Beth (James) Blackmore. One of his maternal grand-uncles was the eccentric Australian journalist Francis James. Blackmore's early hobbies included philately and phillumeny. He read extensively from an early age, particularly Look and Learn with its Trigan Empire science fiction comicstrip, and later the works of Geoffrey Willans, J.P. Martin, Norman Hunter and W.E. Johns. Blackmore's family moved to Armidale where Leigh attended kindergarten and part of First Class at the Armidale Demonstration School (now Armidale City Public School). He was raised by his parents in Methodism but refused automatic confirmation into the church at age 13, preferring to discuss ontology with his minister, who lent him works by Paul Tillich. On the family's return to Sydney, Blackmore completed Primary School at Lane Cove West Primary School. Around age nine, he was deeply affected by a reading of Rudyard Kipling's horror story "The Strange Ride of Morowbie Jukes", by Lucy Boston's fantasy novel The Castle of Yew and terrified by the TV broadcast of Richard Matheson's "Nightmare at 20,000 Feet" episode of The Twilight Zone. He also encountered horror fiction via Stephen P. Sutton's anthologies Tales to Tremble By and More Tales to Tremble By.

Education

He was later educated at North Sydney Boys High School (1971–1972) and Newcastle Boys' High School (1972–1976). In high school, after reading the science fiction anthology series "Out of This World" (edited by Mably Owen and Amabel Williams-Ellis), he graduated to devouring the works of Ray Bradbury, Peter Saxon, H. Rider Haggard, Isaac Asimov, Arthur Conan Doyle, Agatha Christie, and Leslie Charteris, and became a keen enthusiast of sword and sorcery fiction as represented by Lin Carter's Flashing Swords anthologies and Thongor series novels, Edgar Rice Burroughs's Martian tales, Michael Moorcock's Elric sequence and others, and horror fiction (especially the Weird Tales school, including Clark Ashton Smith, Robert Bloch, Frank Belknap Long, Donald Wandrei and H.P. Lovecraft's Cthulhu Mythos), discovering their work via anthologies edited by August Derleth, Peter Haining, Karl Edward Wagner (the Year's Best Horror Stories series), and via publications of Arkham House which he special-ordered via Space Age Books (Melbourne), then Australia's only specialist supplier of science fiction and fantasy books.

He was also greatly influenced by the Skywald 'horror mood' comics (Nightmare, Psycho and Scream) and Warren Publishing's stable of horror comics such as Creepy, Eerie and Vampirella, and the film magazine Famous Monsters of Filmland.

The Arcane Sciences Society; The Horror-Fantasy Society; Azathoth Productions

While at high school, Blackmore co-founded the Arcane Sciences Society and the Horror-Fantasy Society; the journal of the societies, Cathuria (named after a place in Lovecraft's story "The White Ship"), was banned after three issues by Blackmore's high school principal for quoting in a review four-letter words used by the unleashed monster in Flesh Gordon. With high school friends Lindsay Walker and Michael Blaxland, Blackmore formed a small independent movie house called Azathoth Productions. The only film made was an uncompleted version of Clark Ashton Smith's story The Double Shadow, though Blackmore also penned a screenplay for Lovecraft's story The Music of Erich Zann (never shot).

Early writing, fandom and occultism

Having corresponded with writers and enthusiasts in the field such as Brian Lumley, Ramsey Campbell, Glenn Lord, W.H. Pugmire and Gregory Nicoll, he began (aged 13) to write fiction and speculative poetry in the vein of Lovecraft and C.A. Smith. Fictional juvenilia included "The Last Town" (a Lord Dunsany pastiche), "The Sacrifice" (based on an image of death from Ingmar Bergman's The Seventh Seal), and an uncompleted sword-and-sorcery novel, Starbreaker (with Ashley Morris). Several of these juvenile tales were first printed in Charles Danny Lovecraft's fanzine Avatar in the 1990s.

His earliest in-print appearances included Lovecraftian sonnets in R. Alain Everts' magazines The Arkham Sampler (new series) and Etchings and Odysseys. Blackmore wrote poetry extensively while in high school, with some of the earliest examples being verses such as "Which Will Not Be Favourably Received" and "Keep Your Cabins, You Do Assist the Storm"; most of this mainstream verse remains unpublished. Blackmore was also a devotee of horror movies principally from the Hammer horror and Amicus Productions era. Samuel Beckett and William S. Burroughs became lasting literary influences at this time, the latter after his high-school English teacher lent him a copy of The Wild Boys (novel).

Early interest in the world of science fiction fandom was evidenced by Blackmore's attendance of Aussiecon 1 (the 33rd World Science Fiction Convention and the first such held in Australia) in 1975 at the age of 15. He there met such figures as Forrest J. Ackerman (who showed him the ring which had been worn by Bela Lugosi when playing Dracula) and Jack L. Chalker (publisher of Mirage Press); he was enthralled by Ursula K. le Guin's guest of honour speech in which she spoke of science fiction breaking out of the 'literary ghetto' and declaring that 'Philip K. Dick deserves to be placed on the shelf alongside Dickens'.

He also played judo, Kendo and jiu-jitsu during high school in Sydney (at North Sydney Boys' High) and judo at Newcastle (at Newcastle Police Citizens Boys' Club, Broadmeadow); however he was only formally graded in judo. 

Blackmore also became interested in Aleister Crowley through reading Moonchild (novel), Crowley's Confessions: An Autohagiography and the John Symonds biography The Great Beast. His other occult studies began with books in the Dennis Wheatley 'Library of the Occult' series and with volumes by such authors as Paul Huson (on Tarot and witchcraft) and Idries Shah's The Secret Lore of Magic (on Goetia) as well as June John's biography King of the Witches, on Alex Sanders. Blackmore began to read Tarot at this time, using primarily the Thoth tarot deck.

Early career and writing (1977–1990)

Blackmore attended Macquarie University for one year, joining the university's science fiction club and contributing to their zine Telmar. He showed early interest in unconventional art practice and anti-art after reading volumes on op art, pop art, and Sol LeWitt, whose work he homaged via a Mail Art network restricted to Australia. Beginning a 25-year career as a bookseller in 1978, he then worked in his spare time as an editorial assistant on The Australian Horror and Fantasy Magazine in the early 1980s; Blackmore went on to publish and co-edit its successor, Terror Australis magazine from 1987–1992.

In the 1980s, Blackmore published bibliographies on Brian Lumley and H.P. Lovecraft (the latter in collaboration with S.T. Joshi). In 1983 Blackmore met writer and poet (Danny) Charles Lovecraft through the letter column of Crypt of Cthulhu; Lovecraft would later found P'rea Press which published Blackmore's first poetry collection. He attended Syncon '83, a science fiction convention at which the Guests of Honour were Harlan Ellison and Van Ikin, and where he first met writer Terry Dowling. Blackmore learned the art of first edition book collecting through his association with fan, DUFF-winner and collector Keith Curtis. While attending Sydney University,(where he majored in Semitic Studies), Blackmore came in contact with Don Boyd, then editor of (Australian) Futuristic Tales.  Blackmore came to be a well-regarded Lovecraft scholar, carrying on correspondence with other Lovecraft fans in countries including USA, the UK, New Zealand, Japan, France, Germany, Italy, Poland and Russia. He was a member of the early Esoteric Order of Dagon under Mollie Werba and the Necronomicon (under R. Alain (Randy) Everts) Lovecraftian amateur press associations, with his zines Red Viscous Madness, and Forbidden Dimensions, Nameless Dreams. (He rejoined the EOD around 2000, contributing continuous quarterly zines for it ever since).

His first published story was "The Infestation", adapted for graphic form by Gavin O'Keefe and published in the fourth issue of Phantastique (1986), a comic which attracted notoriety (questions were asked in Australian Federal Parliament) for being government-funded via an Arts Council grant while containing visceral images and story content.

He worked as a bookseller in Sydney for 25 years (1979–2004), primarily managing specialist science fiction & fantasy departments within larger bookstores such as Dymocks. Authors hosted by Blackmore for events and signings at Dymocks George St include Storm Constantine, Harlan Ellison, Richard Harland, Douglas Adams, Terry Pratchett, Bill Congreve, Simon Brown, Kyla Ward, Robert Hood, Cat Sparks, and Bryce J. Stevens.

Music

Blackmore had classical piano training, but his formative musical influences were The Beatles, Black Sabbath, Alice Cooper, David Bowie, Roxy Music, The Stooges, Genesis, Queen, Rick Wakeman, King Crimson, Television, XTC and such experimental bands as Henry Cow, Can and The Residents, along with Australian bands such as The Church, The Reels, The Models, Midnight Oil, MEO 245, Allniters, Outline and Voight 465. He had jammed with garage bands in his high school years in Newcastle, New South Wales including  sessions at Newcastle Cathedral underground studio with Lindsay Walker (guitar), Paul Beal (drums) and Ashley Morris (bass).

On moving back to Sydney in 1977, Blackmore played synthesisers and drums (and occasionally sang) with Sydney New Wave band Worm Technology and other bands. From a mixture of influences including prog and experimental rock, pop and punk, Worm Technology evolved their unique sound while living together in an old schoolhouse in Rozelle in Sydney. Walker was a primary school friend of Blackmore's; meanwhile Walker had befriended guitarist and synth player (an early user of synthesisers, including the Steiner-Parker Synthacon) at high school.

Tiploid Grundy & the Rabid Slime Moulds
One of their earliest recordings (1977) includes a reggae version of "Kookaburra", played strictly for laughs. A cassette-only album of punk-style acoustic and vocal originals, "If You Don't Care for Your Scalp You Get Rabies" (1977) (its title a line uttered by Terry Jones in the Monty Python episode "Mr Neutron"), performed by Blackmore, Walker and Smith, was released under the band name Tiploid Grundy and the Rabid Slime Moulds. "Boils" was a parody of then-fashionable punk music by Blackmore, with a riff possibly cribbed from Paul McCartney's song "Smile Away". Simultaneously, with Smith, Blackmore initially concentrated on composing electronic music using sequencers, including the Robert Fripp and Brian Eno-influenced "Music for Bookshops" (1979), and a concept-cycle, recorded on reel-to-reel tape, called "The Guardian," based on a collaborative fantasy story written by the duo. When John Gardner (bass) joined, the band also released some cassette-only recordings including The Loungeroom Tapes and The Christmas Tapes.

Worm Technology
The band stabilised as a four-piece rock band with live drums as Worm Technology, though synth-based instrumentals such as "Africa" often featured in their sets. Blackmore initially played electric organ, string machine (a non-proprietary version of the Mellotron) and synthesiser, with Smith as drummer and synth programmer, but Blackmore often drummed when Smith was playing guitar or bass; his drum style was largely influenced by the Buzzcocks' John Mayer and The Jam`s Rick Buckler. Smith's girlfriend Myfanwy (Miffy) Ryan played violin, but dropped out after a year. (Ryan has since played with such renowned Australian folk bands as Madd Marianne, Wongawilli Band, Quartet d'Gong, Denizen and ClearStrings).

Worm Technology initially played covers by 1960s-1970s acts including Kevin Ayers, Lou Reed, The Troggs, Them, The Human Beinz, Modern Lovers, Ramones, Elvis Costello, The Jam and The Buzzcocks, and punkified medleys of old TV cartoon theme tunes such as Astroboy, Marine Boy and Gigantor (WT were playing their "Gigantor" cover before Californian punk band The Dickies recorded theirs in 1980.). Their deconstructed version of "Satisfaction" by the Rolling Stones, featuring Walker's famed one-note guitar solo on an amplified tin toy guitar bought from an op shop, preceded Devo's take on the same number.

Worm Technology continued performing quirky originals, from "Here Come the Lonely Vegetables" to "Three Years on the Road", a country-and-western parody penned by Blackmore. Both Blackmore and Walker were both particularly influenced by The Residents, The Bonzo Dog Doo-Dah Band, The Velvet Underground, The B-52s and by Lenny Kaye's Nuggets series of sixties garage-rock reissues – influences which skewed their pop sensibility. John Gardner was consistently the bassplayer throughout Worm Technology's existence; he never contributed lyrics or music. Rhythm guitarist Malcolm Elliott and second vocalist Peter Rodgers entered, left and re-entered the band lineup at different periods. The band played one early gig where Blackmore had briefly left, under the moniker "Leigh Blackmore's Rainbow". Elliott and Rodgers also contributed song lyrics, as did mixer Garry Ryan, all of which were put to music by Greg Smith. Elliott's "Slept-On Hair" and "Simulus Stimulus", Ryan's "Cry Laughing Clown", "Technical Suicide" and "Pilot", and Rodger's "Who Do We Think We Are?" were all popular elements of Worm Technology's set. Many of the bands early gigs were at church halls, as several of the band members were Christians. (Blackmore experienced a conversion to Christianity which lasted until a renewed rejection of it in the mid-1980s). Ian Walker became a Christian youth worker. Rodgers went on to become an Anglican minister and missionary in Indonesia 1991-2002; later Rector of St Stephen's, Newtown and Federal Secretary of the (Australian) Church Missionary Society).

Blackmore wrote many of the band's song lyrics, some in collaboration with vocalist Ian Walker (though Walker often wrote alone), and guitarist Greg Smith wrote much of the music, though Blackmore wrote both lyrics and music for some songs including the Buzzcocks-inspired "Apathy." Blackmore's other song lyrics included audience favourites such as "Outerspaceville", "Futile Minds", "Living for Today" (partly inspired by Black Sabbath's "Looking for Today") and the Ramones-influenced "Infidelity". The band put unique twists on some of their covers, such as playing Glen Campbell's "By the Time I Get to Phoenix" in a Joy Division style, and doing a rock version of the Brian Eno/Cluster piece "Broken Head".

Worm Technology played gigs at various inner-city venues such as the Vulcan Hotel, Taverners Hill Hotel, The Rehearsal Room and the Sussex Hotel. They participated in a number of annual Strawberry Hills Hotel band competitions, along with such contemporary bands as The Hard-Ons. WT also undertook tours including the 'We Are Not the New Dylan Tour' (1980) in which they played obscure NSW country towns such as Fish River (Oberon) and The Lagoon; and the "Moo Cow Tour", in which they played in several Sydney milk-bars. The band also issued several numbers of their official fanzine, Prince the Wonder Dog which were given away at gigs.

The band often parodied musical trends, as in "Dull Rapsville" (lyrics Blackmore/Walker; music Smith), a parody of early rap a la Grandmaster Flash. Continuing their disdain of most rock posturing, the band played one tour with all members dressed as crooner Val Doonican, wearing cardigans and thick black spectacles. Lead vocalist Ian Walker's renowned stage act included using a toy rabbit owned in Blackmore's childhood as a prop for the song "Furry Animals", and standing on a chair throughout the song "The Tree (That was Not a Tree)". In the original song (Revenge of the) Phantom Agents (based on the 1960s Japanese TV series), the band threw cardboard shuriken into the audience. In 1980, Greg Smith wrote a rock opera, The Lift, in the vein of works such as Genesis' The Lamb Lies Down on Broadway and rehearsed Worm Technology intensively in its performance; a more serious work, it bemused many Worm Technology fans and received one live performance only; it was issued as both a studio and live cassette-only album. One song from the work, "Stereotypists", was re-vamped as "The Aliens" and became a set staple.

Worm Technology released several cassette-only albums including In Your Loungeroom (1985)(engineered by the band's mixer/sound technician, Garry Ryan). This contained two tracks imported from Ian Walker's side-project duo The Togs (with WT band manager Rik Ford), and other songs including "Crimefighter" (sung as if by a world-weary Batman) and the popular rock number "Wombats" (lyrics Blackmore) in which Blackmore put together his synth solo by segueing keyboard lines from songs by Iggy Pop, Fischer Z, and The Angels, and Smith took his guitar line from "Magazine Madonna" by Sherbet. The band's later original repertoire tended to include a mix of catchy synth-driven pop songs such as "So Alone" and "Can't Stand the Pace", straightahead rock numbers such as "Can't You See," "The Light" "Love Grows Cold," "Out of Sync" and "The Height of Love," reflective numbers like "The King is Dead," "No Fear," and "Set your Mind Right," and danceable numbers including ska number "(Put it in a) Nutshell", mostly penned entirely by Smith.

Koga Ninja
Worm Technology had several offshoot bands including Koga Ninja (named after characters from the 1960s TV show The Samurai), in which the band members (Blackmore, Smith and Elliott) dressed up as ninjas in costumes made by Smith. The band used synths and drum machines extensively. Koga Ninja released several cassette only live albums.

Astropop, Post-Mortem and White Stains
Blackmore largely abandoned music when Worm Technology broke up, to concentrate on his writing, although Astropop, a short-lived synthpop duo featuring Blackmore and Smith (extending Worm Technology's late emphasis on extended synthesiser-based numbers such as "Samurai") had some success playing electronica including Kraftwerk covers but never recorded. Blackmore drummed for Post-Mortem (1987), a band which featured Ian Walker from Worm Technology, bassist Brian Pember from Sydney Christian new wave band Crossroad/Surprise, and a guitarist only remembered as Colin. There are no extant recordings of Astropop or Post-Mortem. In the mid-1990s Blackmore recorded with the short-lived experimental group White Stains (1990) (named after Aleister Crowley's poetry volume of the same title, White Stains), with illustrator and viola-player Gavin O'Keefe. White Stains released a cassette single "Acid Bath" (Blackmore/O'Keefe") backed with "The Finger", a musical interpretation of William Burrough's story about a man who cuts off his own finger.

The Third Road
Blackmore resumed playing music semi-professionally in 2009 with the formation of the Illawarra-based 'popstalgia' trio The Third Road in which he plays five- and six-string bass and shares vocal duties with guitarist Margi Curtis and keyboards player Graham Wykes. The Third Road developed from the band Fedora, a trio featuring Curtis, Wykes and Bruce Greenfeld (later of Damned Fine Gentlemen). Blackmore joined on bass when Greenfeld left. The Third Road has played live in Wollongong at various events including the Thriving Illawarra Festival, Summer on the (Crown St) Mall, the annual National Disabilities Day gig organised by Essential Personnel (sometimes accompanied by singer/guitarist Al Morrison of Riogh), and at the annual Christmas party of the NSW Greens. They have also frequently performed Xmas gigs at Sydney's Royal Automobile Club of Australia.

Later career

H.P. Lovecraft Centennial Conference

In 1990 Blackmore travelled via New York (where he met Peter H. Cannon, and interviewed Frank Belknap Long) to Providence for the H.P. Lovecraft Centennial Conference. As one of the Friends of Lovecraft group organised by S.T. Joshi, Jon Cooke and Will Murray, Blackmore contributed financially to erecting the memorial plaque in honour of Lovecraft which was erected outside the John Hay Library. In Providence, Blackmore met such figures as author Les Daniels,cartoonist and author Gahan Wilson, Marc A. Michaud (publisher of Necronomicon Press), critic Will Murray, editor David E. Schultz, Philip J. Rahman (copublisher of Fedogan and Bremer, with whom he made an agreement to act as F&B's Australian distributor), Italian scholar Giuseppe Lippi, critic Steven J. Mariconda, French scholar Jean-Luc Buard, Necronomicon Press illustrators Jason C. Eckhardt and Robert H. Knox, editor Robert M. Price, critic Paul Buhle, and German scholar Kalju Kirde. He attended the world premiere of Re-Animator. Blackmore also spent time with writers Dennis Etchison and William F. Nolan while in Los Angeles.

Terror Australis, the Gargoyle Club and the Sydney Futurian Society
With Christopher Sequeira and Bryce J. Stevens, Blackmore co-edited Terror Australis: The Australian Horror and Fantasy Magazine (1987–1992) and co-founded the Gargoyle Club: The Sydney Horror Writers and Artists Society, which included Sydney horror writers and artists including Gavin O'Keefe, underground graphic novelists Steve 'Carnage' Carter and Antoinette Rydyr; Rod Marsden, Don Boyd and others. The Gargoyle Club operated in Leichhardt, New South Wales and Petersham until 1992, after which it moved to venues in inner city Sydney and was subsequently joined by writers such as David Carroll and Kyla Ward. The club published two issues of their horror fiction magazine Cold Cuts co-edited by Antoinette Rydyr, Ron Clarke and Don Boyd, Art Director was Steve Carter.

Terror Australis the magazine was followed by the anthology Terror Australis: Best Australian Horror (1993), the first mass-market Australian horror anthology (edited by Blackmore alone). Leanne Frahm's story "Catalyst" from the anthology won the Ditmar Award for best Australian Short Fiction. Blackmore was an invited judge on the Aurealis Award in 1995 and on the George Turner (writer) Award in 1999.

In 1994–95, Blackmore was the Australian representative for the Horror Writers of America under the Presidency of Dennis Etchison.

Blackmore often hosted gatherings of the Futurian Society of Sydney (run by sf bibliographer/researcher and secondhand bookdealer Graham Stone) at his Leichardt home. Regular attendees included Kevin Dillon and David Ritchie. Blackmore also acquired the majority of his holdings of Weird Tales magazine via Stone over a period of around a decade.

Anarchism, Thee Temple ov Psychick Youth, Thoughtcrimes, the O.T.O. and Sydney Zeroist Alliance
In the early 1990s, owing to instinctive rejection of methods of social control, Blackmore became involved with the anarchist scene around Jura Books and the squatters collective Jellyhedz in Sydney, though his primary political interests lay in the Situationist International (especially the works of Guy Debord); and the ontological anarchism of Hakim Bey. The works of Colin Wilson became increasingly important to him (he interviewed Wilson in 1993) as did self-actualization and Timothy Leary's Eight Circuit Model of Consciousness as promulgated in Prometheus Rising by Robert Anton Wilson. Blackmore has an ongoing participatory involvement with psychogeography and the dérive. After discovering AK Press and Vague magazine, Blackmore co-founded Thoughtcrimes, an independent distributor of radical books and tapes which also operated culture-jamming and subvertising campaigns. Thoughtcrimes existed at roughly the same time as the American CrimethInc. began, with both drawing their names from the work of George Orwell. In this period Blackmore issued copyleft fanzines such as Antics: a Journal ov Anti-Control and The Possibility of Finding Such a Dog. Thoughtcrimes was succeeded by Blackmore's Sydney Zeroist Alliance project of the early 2000s, which was inspired by both the Situationists (specifically by the notion of the Situationist prank), by original Neoism and by post-situ Stewart Home's projects such as the Art Strike, Praxis and the Neoist Alliance, as well as by the occult/mathematical significance of zero.

Also in the early 1990s, following a renewed interest in ceremonial magic along with influence from the performance art, music and Mail Art of Genesis P. Orridge, Blackmore joined Thee Temple ov Psychick Youth via their Australian station, TOPY Chaos. Reading deeply in Aleister Crowley and other esoteric material, he accepted The Book of the Law, took the magical name Fr. LVX/NOX and was initiated into several degrees in Crowley's Ordo Templi Orientis. via their Sydney body, Oceania Oasis (later Oceania Lodge). He was ordained as a Deacon in the Ecclesia Gnostica Catholica and performed in several contemporary series of the Rites of Eleusis and in Crowley's mystery play The Ship. He has taken the role of Priest in Liber XV, The Gnostic Mass in the Illawarra and presented numerous workshops based on Crowley's magick.

Marriage, honours degree and aftermath
Blackmore married fellow bookseller and Neopagan Glayne Louise Vowles, with whom he had been in a relationship since 1994, in 1999 in a Hermetic ceremony which included readings from the Emerald Tablet of Hermes, Liber AL and The Black Book of Carmarthen. Certain items at the wedding were inscribed with the motto "In girum imus nocte et consumimur igni" ("We dance in the darkness and are consumed by fire"), from the title of the 1978 film by Guy Debord. However, the couple divorced in 2001. Blackmore then moved from Parramatta to Earlwood, with friends including Peter Wilson, vocalist/trumpeter for Sydney-based ska band Backy Skank. Vowles died in June 2009 aged 36. The Futurian Society of Sydney, to which she had belonged, observed a minute's silence at their meeting of 17 July 2009 for her, and for Locus editor Charles N. Brown, who had also recently died.

In 2001, Blackmore's comic-book story "The Gargoyle Club Gambit" (co-written with Christopher Sequeira) was published in Bold Action, a one-shot special.

In 2004, Blackmore left the book trade and relocated to Wollongong. He took a mature-age degree (Bachelor of Creative Writings (Hons)) at the University of Wollongong (2009–2016). A devotee of the Pre-Raphaelite painters, Blackmore wrote the creative component of his Honours thesis was a 35,000-word ficto-critical novella on the relationship between Dante Gabriel Rossetti and Elizabeth Siddall. The critical component of the thesis was on Terry Dowling.

In 2011 he started his own editorial and manuscript appraisal business, Proof Perfect Editorial Services. He is a member of the Society of Editors (NSW). He regularly workshops fiction with a writer's group including Margaret Curtis and Andrea Gawthorne.

Writing, editing, convention appearances
Blackmore has been a guest lecturer on science fiction, fantasy and horror for the University of Wollongong's Faculty of Creative Arts. He has guested as an expert on horror literature and film on TV programs in Australia including Ray Martin's Midday (television show), cable TV program The Graveyard Shift and Jennifer Byrne Presents and has been interviewed on Sydney's 2SER radio in the same capacity.

He became the second President of the Australian Horror Writers Association, serving from September 2010 until September 2011.

Blackmore is Official Editor (with Scott A. Shaeffer) of the Sword and Sorcery and Weird Fiction Terminus (SSFWT) amateur press association (founded by Benjamin Szumskyj) which has members in Australia, the US, the UK, Sweden and Finland. SSWFT reached its 50th mailing in August 2013. (Blackmore's own contributions can be found archived on www.scribd.com). Blackmore also contributes a regular zine to S.T. Joshi's "Esoteric Order of Dagon" Amateur Press Association. (Some issues can be found housed in Cuyler W. 'Ned' Brooks' fanzine archive.) He is also a member of the Australian Sherlock Holmes society the Sydney Passengers, and of the C.G. Jung Society of Sydney.

He is a frequent panellist at science fiction conventions such as the Magic Casements Festival (Sydney, 2003). the annual Conflux convention in Canberra (where with Margi Curtis he often runs workshops on magick), and has been a panellist at Constantinople Australian National Science Fiction Convention(Melbourne, 1994), Freecon (Sydney, 2003) and Aussiecon 4 (Melbourne, 2010).

Blackmore was heavily involved as a speaker and promoter in the June 2019 Australian speaking tour by Lovecraft scholar S. T. Joshi and lectured on Lovecraft alongside Joshi, Larry Sitsky and others at the ANU School of Music, Canberra and at the NSW Masonic Club in Sydney.

In 2020 Blackmore served as convenor and judge on the Poetry category of the Australian Shadows Awards.

Award nominations

Work

Collections
Spores from Sharnoth and Other Madnesses (P'rea Press, 2008) (verse). .
Sharnoth's Spores and Other Seeds (Rainfall Books, 2010) (verse; variant edition of Spores from Sharnoth – omits some poems and adds others).
Horrors of Sherlock Holmes (R'lyeh Texts, 2017) (fiction). Introduction by Peter H. Cannon. .

Selected standalone nonfiction work

Books
 Brian Lumley: A New Bibliography. Penrith NSW: Dark Press, 1984. San Bernardino, CA: Borgo Press, 1985.
 Terry Dowling: Virtuoso of the Fantastic. (R'lyeh Texts, Apr 2005).

Record Album Liner Notes
 Aleister Crowley. At the Fork of the Roads. Cadabra Records, March 2022. 7-inch vinyl recording on various colours of vinyl (total 500 copies). Narrated by Laurance Harvey, score by Chris Bozzone. Blackmore's liner notes essay as by Frater HekAL
 Edogawa Rampo The Red Chamber. Cadabra Records, Summer 2023. LP vinyl recording.

As editor
Terror Australis: The Australian Horror & Fantasy Magazine (co-edited with Bryce J. Stevens and Chris G.C. Sequeira) (1988–1992): Nos. 1, 2, 3. 
Terror Australis: The Best of Australian Horror. Hodder & Stoughton, 1993. 
Antics: A Personal Journal ov Anti-Control.(1993, 3 issues)
Mythopoeia: The Newsletter of Dymocks Science Fiction & Fantasy (co-edited with Glayne Louise) (1995–97)
Studies in Australian Weird Fiction (co-edited with Benjamin J. Szumskyj, Phillip A. Ellis and James Doig) (2008– ) Issues 1–3 published by Equilibrium Books, W.A. Issue 4 published by Borgo Press.
And Then I Woke Up: A Zine About Dreams (co-edited with Chris Postill and Miriam Wells) (Wollongong NSW: Oneiros Dreamzine Collective, Faculty of Creative Arts, University of Wollongong, Oct 2007). Illustrated by Leigh Blackmore.
Midnight Echo, No. 5. Australian Horror Writers Association (2011)

Selected critical writings and bibliographies

 Reprint in The Fossil 105:3 No, 340, (April 2009).
 

 

 

  Revised reprint in The Passenger's Log: Journal of the Sydney Passengers (Sherlock Holmes Society), Vol 19, Nos 3 &4 (2016). 
 
  
 
  
  
  
 

 Reprint in Science Fiction: A Review of Speculative Literature, Volume 20, Numbers 1-2, Whole Numbers 51-52 Special Double Issue: the Early Work of Terry Dowling (2019).
 Reprinted in Australian Studies in Weird Fiction, No. 4 (Winter 2011).
 Nominated for the William Atheling Jr. Award for Criticism.
| Reprint in Gafford, Sam and S.T. Joshi (eds) William Hope Hodgson: Voices from the Borderland: Seven Decades of Criticism on the Master of Cosmic Horror NY: Hippocampus Press, 2014. Nominated for the William Atheling Jr. Award for Criticism.

 
 

 
 
 
 
 Reprint in Lovecraft Annual, No 15 (2021).

Fiction
  (Script by Blackmore based on his short story; art by Gavin O'Keefe)
 . Reprint in Bold Action number'1 (2002).
 
 
  
 
 
 
 
 . A Deadlocke and Doc Marten story.
 
 . Science fiction story.
 
  Reprint in Aurealis number 38/39 (September 2007)

Poetry
Blackmore's weird verse (primarily formalist in style) has appeared variously in And Then I Woke Up!,Arkham Sampler, Avallaunius: The Journal of the Arthur Machen Society, Beastly, Cyaegha, EOD, The Eldritch Dark, EOD, Etchings & Odysseys, Melaleuca, Midnight Echo, New Lovecraft Collector, Penumbra, Shoggoth, The Small Tapestry, Spectral Realms, Strange Sorcery, Telmar, and Weird Fiction Review.

Much of Blackmore's weird poetry to 2008 is collected in Spores from Sharnoth & Other Madnesses, with a foreword by S.T. Joshi. The US journal Dead Reckonings declared that the collection "at once establishes Blackmore as one of the leading weird poets of our time." A variant edition of this title, omitting the introduction and P'rea Press editors' foreword, and with some poems excluded and others added, under the title Sharnoth's Spores & Other Seeds, was published by Rainfall Books in 2010.

General poetry has appeared in Melaleuca, Tertangala, and at Australian Reader and Pool online. Blackmore has read his poetry live at various venues in NSW including Live Poets at Don Bank (North Sydney), Yours and Owls Café (Wollongong), Jane's (Wollongong) and Philanthropy Tribe Book Cafe (Wollongong). Blackmore has also recorded readings of many of the poems of Clark Ashton Smith, e.g. "Chant to Sirius".

Recent poetry has appeared in anthologies and magazines including:
 Charles Lovecraft (ed) Avatars of Wizardry (Sydney: P'rea Press, 2012)
 S.T. Joshi and Stefan Dziemianowicz (eds) Dreams of Fear: Poetry of Terror and the Supernatural (NY: Hippocampus Press, 2013)
 Elizabeth R. McClellan & Ashley Brown (eds) The 2014 Rhysling Poetry Anthology: The Best Science Fiction, Fantasy and Horror Poetry of 2013 (SFPA, 2014). 
 Graham Phillips (ed) Cyaegha No 13 (Spring 2015).
 Gutiérrez, Juan Julio (ed) Beyond the Cosmic Veil (Horrified Press/Barbed Wire Butterfly Press, 2015).
 Adam Joffrain (ed) Nightgaunt No 2 (July 2015) [France; collaboration-translation with Adam Joffrain].
 Steve Lines (ed) Hallowe'en Howlings. (Calne, Wiltshire: Rainfall Books (UK), Oct 2015).
 Danny Gardner (ed) Can I Tell You a Secret?: Live Poets at Don Bank's 25th Anniversary Anthology. (Canberra: Ginninderra Press, Nov 2015.) 
 John T. Allen (ed) Songs of the Shattered World: The Broken Hymns of Hastur. (Ticketyboo Press/Green Sun Press [Createspace], Feb 2016)
 Sam Gafford (ed) Sargasso: The Journal of William Hope Hodgson Studies 3 (2016)
 Glynn Barrass and Frederick J. Mayer (eds). Anno Klarkash-ton. (Calne, Wiltshire: Rainfall Books, 2017). 
 Joshi, S.T. (ed) Penumbra No 1 (2020) and No 2 (2021) 9NY: Hippocampus Press)
 Frank Coffman (ed) Speculations III: Poetry from the Weird Poets Society (Mind's Eye Press, 2021)
 Calhoun, Pat (ed). Weird and Wondrous: An Anthology of Fantasy Poetry (2023)
 S.T. Joshi (ed). For the Outsider: Poems About H. P. Lovecraft (NY: Hippocampus Press, 2023)

Blackmore has collaborated on poems with US poets Richard L. Tierney, Fred Phillips, K.A. Opperman and Ann K. Schwader; with French poet Adam Joffrain; and with Australian poet Charles Lovecraft. His poem "The Last Dream" was a nominee for Best Long Poem in the annual Rhysling Award.

In Oct 2021, three of Blackmore's weird poems were featured as part of a series of Hallowe'en recorded poetry readings hosted on Facebook by fellow weird poet Scott Couturier.

Reviews, radio and other works
Blackmore regularly reviews horror fiction for US critical journal Dead Reckonings. His past review work of horror and fantasy fiction includes contributions to AsIF.com, Galaxy Newsletter, Lovecraft Annual, The New York Review of Science Fiction, OzHorrorscope (online blog reviews), Prohibited Matter (column – "The State of the Nightmare"), Science Fiction (column – "Darkside"), Shoggoth, Skinned Alive, Spectral Realms,and the Sydney Morning Herald.

Blackmore's story "The Infestation" was read live to air by Steven Paulsen on Rick Kennett's 3CR and 3MDR Community radio guest shows "Pilots of the Unknown".

His story "Cemetery Rose" was read by the author and dramatized with sound effects for the Writing Show's Six Days of Hallowe'en podcast (cohosted by Australian Horror Writers Association) in 2006. An interview with Blackmore conducted by Writing Show host Paula Berenstein was broadcast concurrently.

His audio-walk sound piece Carbon Footprints was exhibited as an installation at the University of Wollongong (Faculty of Creative Arts), Oct 2007.

His radio play Calling Water was broadcast in late 2008 on ABC Radio National Airplay.

His collage artwork, which is influenced by the Situationist technique of detournement, has been exhibited at the First Australasian Thelemic Conference (Sydney, 1994) and published in various issues of Tertangala magazine.

Blackmore has adapted several works for short screenplay treatments and stage, including H.P. Lovecraft's The Music of Erich Zann (screenplay), Clark Ashton Smith's "The Double Shadow" (screenplay) and his own stories "Dr Nadurnian's Golem" (stage; workshopped at the University of Wollongong, Faculty of Creative Arts but unproduced) and "Fire on the Ghost Train" (screenplay, as "Inferno").

See also
List of horror fiction authors

Notes

References
S.T. Joshi Emperors of Dreams: Some Notes on Weird Poetry (Sydney: P'rea Press, 2008), pp. 89–90.
S.T. Joshi and Stefan Dziemianowicz (eds). Supernatural Literature of the World: An Encyclopedia. Westport, CT: Greenwood Press, 2005, pp. 1409–10.
Bryce J. Stevens The Fear Codex: Australian Encyclopedia of Dark Fantasy & Horror (Jacobyte Books, CD-ROM, 2001).

External links

 Bio at Austlit Leigh Blackmore | AustLit: Discover Australian Stories
 Podcast of Cemetery Rose plus interview with Paula Berenstein of Writing Show.com
 Vodcast of Monsters and Bloodsuckers (aka 'Vampires, Werewolves and Man-made Monsters in Literature'), presented by Jennifer Byrne on Jennifer Byrne Presents
 Interview with Leigh Blackmore re: AHWA at View from Here magazine

1959 births
Living people
Australian horror writers
Australian literary critics
Australian poets
Australian male short story writers
Cthulhu Mythos writers
People educated at Newcastle Boys' High School
People educated at North Sydney Boys High School